Viking Fotballklubb is a Norwegian football club from the city of Stavanger. It has participated in the UEFA Cup and UEFA Europa League 12 seasons, the European Cup and UEFA Champions League 7 seasons and the European Cup Winners' Cup 1 season.

Overall record

Results 

Notes
 PR: Preliminary round
 1Q: First qualifying round
 2Q: Second qualifying round
 1R: First round
 2R: Second round
 GS: Group stage

References

Europe
Norwegian football clubs in international competitions